The 2023 Berlin repeat state election was held on 12 February 2023 to once again elect the 19th Abgeordnetenhaus of Berlin. The 19th Abgeordnetenhaus was originally elected on 26 September 2021. On 16 November 2022, the Constitutional Court of the State of Berlin declared the results invalid due to numerous irregularities and ordered a repeat election within 90 days. A decision by the Federal Constitutional Court regarding five constitutional complaints is still pending, but will not be decided until after the repeat election. The incumbent government was a coalition of the Social Democratic Party (SPD), The Greens, and The Left led by Governing Mayor Franziska Giffey.

Alongside the Abgeordnetenhaus election, the borough council results were also ruled invalid and repeat elections ordered for the same date.

With 28% of votes, the opposition Christian Democratic Union (CDU) grew by over ten percentage points and emerged as the largest party by a wide margin, the first time it had done so since 1999. All three governing parties declined; the SPD suffered its worst result in over a century with 18.4%, and only barely remained ahead of the Greens by a margin of 53 votes. The Left also slipped to 12%. The Alternative for Germany (AfD) recorded a small upswing to 9%, while the Free Democratic Party (FDP) fell to 4.6% and lost all their seats. Overall, the incumbent government retained a reduced majority. The CDU claimed a mandate to govern given its first-place result, while mayor Giffey committed to remaining in government. The Left called for a renewal of the outgoing coalition.

After various talks between parties, the SPD and CDU voted at the beginning of March to begin negotiations for a grand coalition.

Election date
The election to the 19th Berlin House of Representatives originally took place on 26 September 2021, but the results were ruled invalid by the Berlin Constitutional Court on 16 November 2022. A repeat election was ordered to take place within 90 days – 14 February 2023 at the latest. Constitutionally, the house has a term of five years. The Court's decision did not reset the legislative term, meaning the next regular elections must still take place no later than Autumn 2026. State electoral officer Stephan Bröchler confirmed that the election will take place on Sunday 12 February, the latest possible date.

The sitting members of the House of Representatives who, in accordance with the ruling of the Constitutional Court, remain in office until the repeat election, could circumvent the courts's ruling by dissolving the house and thus bringing about a snap election for a regular 20th legislative period (this is possible under the Berlin state constitution with a two-thirds majority of all members of parliament). However, this move was not being considered.

Electoral system
The Abgeordnetenhaus is elected via mixed-member proportional representation. 78 members are elected in single-member constituencies via first-past-the-post voting. 52 members are then allocated using compensatory proportional representation, distributed in each of Berlin's twelve boroughs. Voters have two votes: the "first vote" for candidates in single-member constituencies, and the "second vote" for party lists, which are used to fill the proportional seats. The minimum size of the Abgeordnetenhaus is 130 members, but if overhang seats are present, proportional leveling seats will be added to ensure proportionality. An electoral threshold of 5% of valid votes is applied to the Abgeordnetenhaus; parties that fall below this threshold are excluded from the Abgeordnetenhaus. However, parties which win at least one single-member constituency are exempt from the threshold and will be allocated seats proportionally, even if they fall below 5%.

Background

In the original election held on 26 September 2021, the SPD remained the largest party with 21.4% of the vote. The Greens grew to become the second-largest party with 18.9%, followed by the Christian Democratic Union (CDU) on 18.0%. The Left saw a small decline to 14.1%. The Alternative for Germany (AfD) lost almost half their voteshare and fell to 8.0%, while the Free Democratic Party (FDP) saw a small improvement to 7.1%. The SPD had led a coalition with the Left and Greens since 2016, which was returned with an increased majority. The government was subsequently renewed under new mayor Franziska Giffey.

Numerous irregularities were reported during the 2021 elections, including shortages of ballot papers, unusually long queues to vote, ballots being delivered to the wrong locations, and in some cases voters being turned away or offered only ballot papers for the federal election. After months of investigation and hearings, in September 2022, the Constitutional Court of the State of Berlin issued a preliminary assessment declaring that a full repeat of the both the state and district council elections was likely necessary. This was confirmed by their official ruling in November. The results of the election were thus voided and new elections ordered for within 90 days.

Parties
The table below lists parties currently represented in the 19th Abgeordnetenhaus of Berlin.

Opinion polls

Graphical summary

Party polling

West Berlin

East Berlin

Results

Government formation
Despite the CDU's strong result and insistence on a mandate to govern, the incumbent coalition of the SPD, Greens, and Left retained its majority. In the wake of the election, numerous outlets noted the likelihood that the CDU would remain in opposition. While preliminary results left a degree of doubt as to whether the SPD or Greens had placed second, initial talks began with a tentative assumption that the SPD had finished ahead. The CDU met separately with the SPD and Greens on 17 February for about four hours each. The atmosphere at the former was described as cool and the latter was friendly and cordial, though SPD were noted as being significantly closer to the CDU on policy compared to the Greens. Further CDU–SPD and CDU–Green discussions took place the next week, as did meetings between the SPD, Greens, and Left.

With all parties except The Left remaining publicly noncommital, speculation began to grew of an CDU-led government rather than a rapid renewal of the outgoing coalition as many expected. Franziska Giffey pushed for clarification on expropriation as a precondition for the SPD to join any coalition, a policy area where the CDU and SPD were noticeably close. RBB suggested that Giffey could be handed a "super portfolio" in a CDU–SPD coalition. The Tagesspiegel also reported that former interior minister and urban development minister Andreas Geisel of the SPD would likely not be appointed to the next cabinet, regardless of coalition, due to his failure of responsibility in overseeing the 2021 election.

Polling conducted by Civey between 17 and 23 February indicated that 45% of voters preferred a CDU–SPD coalition, followed by SPD–Green–Left with 26%, and only 11% for CDU–Green. The final results of the election were published on 27 February, clarifying that the SPD had finished ahead of the Greens, albeit by an even narrower margin of 53 votes.

The Left voted on 28 February to seek a continuation of the coalition with the SPD and Greens. The three parties announced that they had come to an acceptable agreement on expropriation during the course of their discussions. Specifics were not given, but they spoke of a multi-stage process which would be based on the advice of the expert commission.

On 1 March, the SPD state board voted 25 to 12 in favour of seeking coalition negotiations with the CDU. The CDU board unanimously reciprocated the following day. Kai Wegner stated that, while talks had been productive with the Greens, they found greater overlap with the SPD. He also said that while the two still disagreed on a number of points, "new trust" has emerged during exploratory talks. He voiced willingness to compromise on the anti-discrimination law, which the CDU committed to repealing during the campaign, and called for greater tenant protection and housing construction rather than expropriation to solve the housing crisis. He outlined the prospective coalition policy as ensuring the basics work: "making sure Berlin is a safe and clean city where police get modern equipment", with a mobility policy that works for everyone – drivers as well as cyclists and pedestrians.

Franziska Giffey said that the decision to seek a coalition with the CDU was influenced by "respect for the election result", as well as a desire to prevent a CDU–Green coalition, under which she claimed social issues would be left behind. She described the outgoing coalition as "crisis-ridden" for which she blamed the Greens, pointing to conflict over the SPD's 29-euro ticket policy and housing construction, and accused them of a lack of respect for her leadership. The Greens and Left expressed outrage at the SPD's decision; both claimed that they were not informed before the public announcement and that another round of talks had already been agreed on. Bettina Jarasch accused them of "slamming the door" and Silke Gebel described their actions as a breach of trust. Katina Schubert called it "incomprehensible", while Klaus Lederer said that responsibility lay solely with the SPD: "there is nothing insurmountable." The SPD's youth branch Jusos also spoke out in strong opposition to a coalition with the CDU, with chairman Peter Maaß describing the party as a real estate lobby. The group announced they would campaign to reject the coalition agreement when it is presented to the party membership for approval.

The CDU and SPD working groups began negotiations on 13 March. They planned to conclude a coalition pact within three weeks to give the SPD time for its membership vote, and install the new government at the start of May. Giffey clarified the same day that, if negotiations failed, the SPD would not resume talks with the Greens and Left, but go into to opposition and force the CDU and Greens to form government instead.

References

State election
Berlin
Berlin
Elections in Berlin